Chen Ming-tang is a Taiwanese politician. He has served as the Administrative Deputy Minister of Justice in the Executive Yuan since 11 March 2013. In September 2013, he briefly became the acting Minister of Justice after incumbent Minister Tseng Yung-fu's sudden resignation.

ROC Justice Administrative Deputy Ministry

Chen Shui-bian prison transfer
In mid-April 2013, Deputy Minister Chen confirmed that former ROC president Chen Shui-bian was transferred from Taipei Veterans General Hospital to Pei-de Hospital in Taichung Prison, where he will serve his remaining 20 years of sentence there. Deputy Minister Chen added that this transfer was made to ensure former president Chen's proper medical attention, in which it was made in consideration of him being prison inmate, patient and a former president.

Taiwanese fisherman shooting incident
Responding to the shooting incident of Taiwanese fisherman by Philippine government vessel on 9 May 2013 at the disputed water in South China Sea, in end of May 2013, Chen said that the ROC MOJ has declined Philippine request for bilateral judicial assistance because Manila refusal of handing over the incident video to ROC government, although they have agreed to allow Taiwanese investigators to board the Philippine Coast Guard vessel involved in the shooting incident.

See also
 Law of the Republic of China

References

Taiwanese Ministers of Justice
Living people
Year of birth missing (living people)